Edward J. Reilly (August 2, 1905 – July 16, 1953) was an American politician in the state of Washington. He served in the Washington House of Representatives from 1935 to 1954 and 1935 to 1955. He was Speaker of the House from 1937 to 1939 and 1941 to 1945.

References

1953 deaths
1905 births
Democratic Party members of the Washington House of Representatives
20th-century American politicians